William L. Delaney  (1863–1942) was a second baseman in Major League Baseball.

Sources

1863 births
1942 deaths
19th-century baseball players
Baseball players from Ohio
Major League Baseball second basemen
Cleveland Spiders players
Canton Nadjys players
Evansville Hoosiers players
Detroit Wolverines (minor league) players
Elmira Gladiators players
Macon Central City players
Canton Deubers players
Easton Dutchmen players
Pottsville Colts players
New Bedford Whalers (baseball) players
New Bedford Browns players
Taunton Herrings players